Daira speciosa is an extinct species of crab that lived in the Paratethys sea during the Miocene period.

References

External links
 http://zipcodezoo.com/Animals/D/Daira_speciosa/
 https://web.archive.org/web/20120326005503/http://paleotm.com/daira/

Crabs
Miocene crustaceans
Prehistoric animals of Europe
Neogene animals of Africa
Fossil taxa described in 1871